Salma is a Pakistani film directed by Ashfaq Malik and based on writer Nazir Ajmeri's own 1942 film Sharda. The lead cast of the film include Bahar, Allauddin, Yasmin and Ejaz. The music was composed by Rashid Attre. It was Allauddin's first appearance in a leading role. A film from the Golden Age of Pakistani cinema, it explores the themes such as importance of education for girls and necessity of mutual contest in marital relationships. A moderately successful film of 1960, it was later remade in 1980 as Saima, starring Babra Sharif and Nadeem.

Plot 

Fazlu is a quarrelsome, uneducated and unemployed man from a lower-class family, who lives with her mother who hardly makes the both ends meet. His sister, Hameeda is a devoted housewife whose husband Khalil is not happy with her due to lack of mutual understanding between them. He wants to marry again with Salma due to the reason. When Salma visits Khalil along with her mother, Fazlu comes there for her sister by which Salma comes to know that he is already married.

Salma who doesn't like Fazlu due to her previous unpleasant interactions with him, gets his marriage proposal from her teacher. On revealing the Fazlu as a bridegroom-to-be, Salma's mother leaves his house denying furiously. Fazlu's mother dies there short after, and after her death Salma helps him a lot as he has no means of livelihood. She helps him as she likes him but he considers her favors as a price of her sister's life as Khalil still wants to marry her.

Khalil feels guilty when Hameeda meets with a road accident while caring for him because of him. He apologizes her and thanks Salma to realize him his mistake. She then starts teaching Fazlu.

Cast 

 Bahar as Salma
 Allauddin as Fazal Muhammad “Fazlu”
 Yasmin as Hameeda
 Ejaz as Khalil
 Bibbo as Salma's mother
 Salma Mumtaz as Fazlu's mother
 Talish as Khalil's father
 Rekha as Khalil's mother
 A. Shah Shikarpuri

Release 

The film was released on 17 June 1960, in the theaters of Karachi and Lahore, and celebrated golden jubilee at the main cinema.

Soundtrack

References

External links 

Urdu-language Pakistani films
Pakistani black-and-white films
1960s Urdu-language films
Pakistani remakes of Indian films